Ieuan Wyn Jones (born 22 May 1949) is a Welsh politician who was the Deputy First Minister in the Welsh Government from 2007 to 2011. He was the Member of the Senedd for the Ynys Môn constituency from 1999 to 2013, and he was also leader of Plaid Cymru from 2000 to 2012. Jones served as Member of Parliament for Ynys Môn constituency from 1987 to 2001, when he retired to focus on his work in the Welsh Assembly. In 2007, Jones was named Wales' "Politician of the Year" by the BBC Wales am.pm programme. He resigned from the Welsh Assembly on 20 June 2013. In 2017 he unsuccessfully sought to return to the House of Commons for his former constituency.

Background and style

Family, education, and early career

Ieuan Wyn Jones was born in Denbigh, Wales, and is a Welsh speaker. He has lived in both north and south Wales. Jones's early education was at Pontardawe Grammar School and at Ysgol y Berwyn in Bala, Gwynedd. Jones's brother Rhisiart said "The time we spent living in Garnswllt (between Ammanford, in Carmarthenshire, and Pontarddulais, in Swansea) was a very happy time for us as a family," adding "Many people think that Ieuan is just a 'gog' but parts of south Wales are very close to his heart."

In England Jones studied law at Liverpool Polytechnic where he secured an external London University law degree. He qualified as a solicitor in 1973 with second class honours in his solicitors’ finals. Rhisiart Jones said his brother loves to travel and that after college Ieuan "organised a 'rite of passage' trip across Europe in his Hillman Imp."

He was married to Eirian Llwyd until her death in 2014. They had three children together. Jones's hobbies include studying local history, walking, and sports. Jones, a minister's son, is an elder in his local chapel and occasionally preaches. Before entering public service in 1987, Jones was a practising solicitor. Jones became a Member of the Eisteddfod's Gorsedd in 2001.

Personal style

Ieuan Wyn Jones is known as a keen negotiator and a "man of integrity, one who is reliable and 'a good listener'". 
According to Lord Elis-Thomas, Jones assiduously "talks to each (Plaid Cymru assembly) group member individually" and "will ensure the [One Wales] government achieves what it says it will."

Jones is generally seen as a pragmatist, steering a middle course between his party's (predominately southern) socialists and the language-inspired activists of the party's Anglesey and Gwynedd heartland.

Political life

Jones's main political interest is health and education policy. Jones has held a number of positions both in Plaid Cymru and as a UK Member of Parliament and Welsh Assembly Member. He was Plaid Cymru party chairman between 1980–1982 and 1990–1992.

UK Parliament 1987–2001

Jones campaigned for public office for the first time in Denbigh at the October 1974 general election, and stood again in 1979.  At the 1987 general election, he won the Ynys Môn (Anglesey) seat. He continued to represent Ynys Môn until the 2001 general election, when he stood down to concentrate on the Welsh Assembly. While a Member of Parliament, he piloted a private member's bill to assist the hard of hearing in 1989 and was a member of the Welsh Affairs and Agriculture Select Committees. He was the joint chairman of the All-Party Older Persons Group and was appointed as a trustee of the Industry and Parliament Trust, a body promoting better understanding between parliamentarians and industrialists. He won an award as Politician of the Year from the Federation of Small Businesses.

Jones has been a governor of the Westminster Foundation for Democracy, a body that assists in the development of democratic institutions in many parts of the world.

Jones stood down at the 2001 election to spend more time in the Assembly.

First Welsh Assembly 1999–2003

Jones was the Plaid Cymru campaign director during the first elections to the Welsh Assembly in 1999. The elections were seen as a breakthrough by the party, which gained seats in solid Labour areas such as in the Rhondda, Islwyn and Llanelli and achieved by far their highest share of the vote in any Wales-wide election, winning 17 of 60 seats in the Assembly. Plaid Cymru saw themselves as the natural beneficiary of devolution.

In 1999, Jones became the Assembly's first Agriculture and Rural Affairs Committee chairman, a post he retained until February 2000.

Elected party president

He was elected President (Leader) of Plaid Cymru on 4 August 2000 with 77% of the vote over Helen Mary Jones and Jill Evans.

Jones reshuffled the party leadership with Jocelyn Davies as Business Manager; Elin Jones as Chief Whip and Agriculture & Rural Development spokeswoman; Phil Williams as Economic Development spokesman; and Helen Mary Jones as Environment, Transport and Planning and Equal Opportunities spokeswoman. Jones described his cabinet as "strong... capable of taking on Labour in the Assembly as well as making a vital contribution in promoting a positive policy agenda."

Language Controversy

Controversy erupted in mid-winter 2001 when Gwynedd councillor Seimon Glyn voiced concern over "English immigrants" moving into traditionally Welsh-speaking communities. Though some Plaid Cymru colleagues said he had been taken out of context, Jones issued "strict instructions to Plaid Cymru party members that if they chose to speak on the same emotive issue in future, they should take care that their words were not misconstrued." Plaid Cymru refocused the argument back to one of locals being priced out of the housing market: nearly a third of all properties in Gwynedd are bought by people from out of that county. Jones's centrist policies may have been helped further by the formation of Welsh language pressure group Cymuned and the Independent Wales Party.

Llandudno party conference

At the Plaid Cymru party conference of 2002 in Llandudno, Jones called for greater Assembly authority "[on-parity] with Scotland's parliament", and "opposed any military conflict in Iraq, saying it would destabilise the Middle East." Jones also criticized health and public services policies and would end the "endless revamping of structures and administration".

"[Plaid Cymru] has been doing its homework", wrote BBC Wales political reporter Simon Morris, and is "determined to produce a credible programme of public service reform".

Second Welsh Assembly 2003–2007

However, in the Assembly election of May 2003, Plaid Cymru lost five seats, and within a week there were accusations of a plot headed by Assembly Member Helen Mary Jones and four other Plaid Cymru Assembly Members manoeuvring for Jones's removal. But Helen Mary Jones denied involvement. However, Jones resigned as both party president and leader of the assembly group. He admits this was a particularly difficult period.

But within three months he stood again for the position of assembly leader, having received support from both grassroots "all over Wales" and senior party members. The party was undergoing a reorganization and dividing its Cardiff Bay and Westminster responsibilities. This party constitutional change prompted new party elections. Jones was re-elected as Assembly group leader (he had been the party's Business Manager in the Assembly since May). In addition, when leader of the opposition he was also a member of the Assembly's European and External Affairs Committee and North Wales Regional Committee. Of early 2003 Jones said "it has been a remarkable journey for me personally and something that I have great pride in, in a sense, that I have been able to lead the party through a very difficult period.

In 2006, he was awarded an Honorary Fellowship by the University of Wales, Bangor. That summer Jones hiked through Wales on a "Wales Wide" tour from Ynys Môn to Swansea, where he attended the National Eisteddfod. Jones said his conversations with the people he met along the way helped create a manifesto better geared to the real needs of people.

In February 2006, Plaid Cymru undertook changes to its party structure, including designating the leader of the party in the Assembly as its overall leader, with Jones taking the post once more. Additionally, the party unveiled a radical change of image, opting to use "Plaid" as the party's name, although "Plaid Cymru – The Party of Wales" would remain the official title. The party's colours were changed to yellow from the traditional green and red, while the party logo was changed from the triban (three peaks) used since 1933 to a yellow Welsh poppy (Meconopsis cambrica).

Third Welsh Assembly 2007–2011

Jones led Plaid Cymru through the Welsh Assembly election of 3 May 2007. Plaid Cymru increased its share of the vote to 22% and its number of seats from 12 to 15, regaining Llanelli, gaining one additional list seat and winning the newly created constituency of Aberconwy The 2007 election also saw Plaid Cymru's Mohammad Asghar become the first ethnic minority candidate elected to the Welsh Assembly, though on 9 December 2009 he left and joined the Conservatives.

Forming a government

Jones's initial attempts to form a three-party coalition with the Conservative and Liberal Democrat parties failed when the Liberal Democrat leadership backed out of coalition talks. This "Rainbow Coalition" would have formed the first ever PC-led government. With the reappointment of Welsh Labour's Rhodri Morgan as First Minister, the Liberal Democrat general party membership demanded that their leadership restart negotiations with Plaid and the Conservatives. However, by now Jones had entered into coalition talks with Labour in an attempt to form a stable government with Plaid's AMs approving a deal with the Labour Party on 27 June 2007. Labour's special party conference on 6 July 2007 approved the coalition; Plaid Cymru's conference the next day sealed the arrangement.

During the coalition negotiations, Jones pressed for full law-making powers for the Assembly, similar to the Scottish Parliament. A referendum on the issue was promised "as soon as practicable, at or before the end of the assembly term (in 2011)", with Welsh Labour committed to campaign for a "yes" vote. Other points Jones fought for included a first-time buyer's credit, a reconfiguration of the Welsh National Health Care service, and a 3% annual reduction in carbon emissions by 2011 in areas of devolved competence. The result of the negotiations was the One Wales agreement.

Of Plaid Cymru's entering into government for the first time, Jones said, "The party's role so far has been one of the opposition party which put pressure on the other parties to move things forward for the benefit of Wales," and "From today we will be sharing the responsibility of directly operating on behalf of the people of Wales. I am looking forward to the challenge."

Deputy First Minister of Wales
Ieuan Wyn Jones became Deputy First Minister of Wales on 11 July 2007. First Minister and Labour leader Rhodri Morgan was hospitalized days after the parties entered into coalition. Lord Elis-Thomas said of the situation, "I think [Jones] will be a very stable influence around the cabinet table in the difficult situation both parties are in now with the first minister's illness." The next day, Ieuan Wyn Jones, with the Queen, represented Wales in Belgium at the 90th anniversary ceremony of the Third Battle of Ypres at Passchendaele (World War I). During the battle, celebrated Welsh poet Hedd Wyn died along with thousands of other Welshmen.

Jones also represented Wales at the British-Irish Council held in Stormont on 16 July, where he said holding the council in the Stormont Parliament for the first time was "a historic occasion", and "The restoration of devolution was achieved as a result of the coming together, in a spirit of service to all the people of Northern Ireland, of two very distinct political traditions."

On 19 July 2007 it was announced that Jones would also be Minister for the Economy and Transport.

Fourth Welsh Assembly 2011–2013
Jones led Plaid into the Welsh Assembly election of 5 May 2011. Plaid Cymru lost 4 seats and, with 11 seats, became the third largest party in the Assembly; behind Labour (30 seats) and the Conservatives (14). Jones announced on 13 May 2011, the day he ceased being Deputy First Minister, that he would resign as leader of Plaid Cymru within the first half of the Assembly term. Jones remained as an Assembly Member until his resignation on 20 June 2013, in order to take a post leading the new Menai Science Park.

2017 United Kingdom general election
In the 2017 United Kingdom general election, Jones contested the seat of Ynys Môn when he was unsuccessful.

Books

Jones has published three books, Europe: the Challenge for Wales (1996); Y Llinyn Arian (1998), a biography of the Welsh nineteenth century publisher, Thomas Gee, and Jones' own autobiography O'r Cyrion i'r Canol (2021).

Membership
International Film And Television Research Center
International Film And Television Club Of Asian Academy of Film & Television

References

External links
 
Ieuan Wyn Jones' website

|-

|-

1949 births
Living people
Leaders of Plaid Cymru
Leaders of political parties in Wales
Plaid Cymru members of the Senedd
Plaid Cymru MPs
UK MPs 1987–1992
UK MPs 1992–1997
UK MPs 1997–2001
Wales AMs 1999–2003
Wales AMs 2003–2007
Wales AMs 2007–2011
Wales AMs 2011–2016
Welsh-speaking politicians
Members of the Welsh Assembly Government
Alumni of Liverpool John Moores University
Alumni of the University of London
People from Denbigh